Continuconus is a subgenus  of sea snails, marine gastropod mollusks in the family Conidae, the cone snails and their allies.

In the new classification of the family Conidae by Puillandre N., Duda T.F., Meyer C., Olivera B.M. & Bouchet P. (2015), Continuconus has become a subgenus of Conus: Conus (Klemaeconus) Tucker & Tenorio, 2013 represented as Conus Linnaeus, 1758

Species
This list of species is based on the information in the World Register of Marine Species (WoRMS) list. Species within the subgenus Conasprelloides include:
 Continuconus estivali (Moolenbeek & Richard, 1995): synonym of Conus estivali Moolenbeek & Richard, 1995
 Continuconus hirasei (Kuroda, 1956): synonym of Conus hirasei (Kuroda, 1956)
 Continuconus plinthis (Richard & Moolenbeek, 1988): synonym of Conus plinthis Richard & Moolenbeek, 1988
 Continuconus pseudokimioi (da Motta & Martin, 1982): synonym of Conasprella pseudokimioi (da Motta & Martin, 1982)

References

 Tucker J.K. & Tenorio M.J. (2013) Illustrated catalog of the living cone shells. 517 pp. Wellington, Florida: MdM Publishing. page(s): 39

Conidae